Justus Philipp Adolf Wilhelm Ludwig Freiherr von Wolzogen (4 February 1773 – 4 July 1845) was a Württembergian military officer, who served during the Napoleonic Wars.

Biography

Early life
Wolzogen's father, Ernst Ludwig Freiherr von Wolzogen (1723–1774), was a diplomat who served the Duke of Saxe-Hildburghausen. Both his parents died when he was an infant, and he entered the Karlsschule Stuttgart military school in 1781, at the age of eight. He joined the 1st Battalion of the Guards at the Army of Württemberg in 1792. In 1794, after being commissioned as a second lieutenant, he was transferred to the Hügel Infantry Regiment. Shortly afterwards, he entered the Prussian Army's Hohenlohe Regiment as an ensign, hoping to participate in the War of the First Coalition against Napoleon; before he had a chance to be sent to the field, the Peace of Basel ended hostilities between the states. While in Prussia, he met Gerhard von Scharnhorst and became a member of his Military Society, a club of like-minded officers who discussed military affairs.

Wolzogen was also entrusted with the education of young Duke Eugen of Württemberg in 1801. In 1804, he returned to Württemberg and was promoted to major. In November 1805, he was the deputy quartermaster general of the Württembergian detachment, commanded by Honoré Charles Reille, which took part in the War of the Third Coalition. In 1806, he attended the wedding of Catharina of Württemberg and Jérôme Bonaparte. On 6 October, he was given the rank of lieutenant colonel, and appointed commander of the Foot Guards.

In Russia
Wolzogen attempted to rejoin the Prussian Army. His resignation from his post in Württemberg was accepted on 16 May 1807, but the Prussians refused his offer. Instead, he used his connections with Duke Eugen and was given the office of a staff officer in the Imperial Russian Army, which he entered on 23 September. During the following years, he compiled several scholarly works.  On 14 June 1812 he was promoted to colonel, and assigned to the headquarters of Michael Andreas Barclay de Tolly. As such, he served during the French invasion of Russia. In early 1813, Alexander I of Russia appointed him as one of his adjutants in the War of the Sixth Coalition. During the Battle of Leipzig, he noted the precarious disposition of the reserves of Karl Philipp, Prince of Schwarzenberg, and hastened to warn his superiors. In recognition of this, he was promoted to major-general. He was later appointed chief of staff in the III Corps under Karl August, Grand Duke of Saxe-Weimar-Eisenach.

Post-war years
On 5 May 1814 he resigned from the Russian Army, and after attending the Congress of Vienna, was given the rank of a major-general in the Prussian Army on 24 May. He was a member of the commission which reorganized the Prussian Cadet Corps, and was responsible for the military education of the future Wilhelm I. He also joined the reformatory Gesetzlose Gesellschaft zu Berlin. In 1818, he was sent by Frederick William III of Prussia to serve as his country's plenipotentiary in the Military Commission of the German Confederation, which directed the union's armed forces. He remained in this position until his retirement, at the rank of general, on 12 March 1836. In 1820, he married Dorothea Therese Emilie von Lilienberg (1797–1872), with whom he fathered three sons and two daughters.

Wolzogen is remembered today mainly for his wartime memoirs, as well as for his brief appearance in Leo Tolstoy's War and Peace.

References

External links
Ludwig von Wolzogen on napoleon-series.org.

1773 births
1845 deaths
People from Meiningen
Barons of Germany
Military personnel of Württemberg
Russian commanders of the Napoleonic Wars
Prussian commanders of the Napoleonic Wars
Recipients of the Order of St. Anna, 1st class
Burials at the Invalids' Cemetery
Recipients of the Pour le Mérite (military class)
Recipients of the Gold Sword for Bravery
Recipients of the Order of the Sword
Generals of Infantry (Prussia)
Military personnel from Thuringia